This is a list of films which placed number one at the weekend box office for the year 2017.

Number-one films

Most successful films by box office admissions

Most successful films of 2017 by number of movie tickets sold in Austria.

References

See also
 Cinema of Austria 

Austria
2017